Charles Savage was Governor of the Bank of England from 1745 to 1747. He had been Deputy Governor from 1743 to 1745. He replaced William Fawkener as Governor and was succeeded by Benjamin Longuet.

See also
Chief Cashier of the Bank of England

References

External links

Governors of the Bank of England
Year of birth missing
Year of death missing
British bankers
Deputy Governors of the Bank of England